John Erskine, 23rd and 6th Earl of Mar, KT (1675May 1732),  was a Scottish Jacobite who was the eldest son of Charles, 22nd and 5th Earl of Mar (who died in 1689), from whom he inherited estates that were heavily loaded with debt. He was the 23rd Earl of Mar in the first creation of the earldom. He was also the sixth earl in the seventh creation (of 1565). He was nicknamed Bobbing John, for his tendency to shift back and forth from faction to faction, whether from Tory to Whig or Hanoverian to Jacobite. Deprived of office by the new king in 1714, Mar raised the standard of rebellion against the Hanoverians; at the battle of Sheriffmuir in November 1715, Mar's forces outnumbered those of his opponent, but victory eluded him. At Fetteresso his cause was lost, and Mar fled to France, where he would spend the remainder of his life. The parliament passed a Writ of Attainder against Mar, for treason, in 1716 as punishment for his disloyalty, which was not lifted until 1824. He died in 1732.

Early life

In the early 18th century Mar was associated with a party favourable to the government, was one of the Commissioners for the Union, and was made a Scottish Secretary of State; becoming, after the Union of 1707, a representative peer for Scotland, Keeper of the Signet, and a Privy Counsellor. In 1713 Mar was made by the Tories a British Secretary of State, but he seems to have been equally ready to side with the Whigs, and in 1714 he assured the new King, George I, of his loyalty. However, like other Tories, he was deprived of his office, and in August 1715 he went in disguise to Scotland and placed himself at the head of the Jacobite adherents of James Edward, the Old Pretender. This coincided with the arrest and impeachment of Robert Harley and the move of other leading Tories Lord Bolingbroke and the Duke of Ormonde into exile.

1715 Rising

Meeting many Highland chieftains at Aboyne, Mar avowed an earnest desire for the independence of Scotland. At Braemar on 6 September 1715, he proclaimed James VIII King of Scotland, England, France and Ireland, thus beginning the Jacobite rising of 1715. Gradually the forces under his command were augmented, but as a general he was a failure. Precious time was wasted at Perth, a feigned attack on Stirling was without result, and he could give little assistance to the English Jacobites. At Sheriffmuir, where a battle was fought in November 1715, Mar's forces largely outnumbered those of his opponent, the Duke of Argyll. The battle was actually inconclusive (each army's right wing defeated the other's left wing). However, Mar's indecisiveness meant that the aftermath of the battle was strategically a decisive defeat for the Jacobites.

Exile
Mar then met the Pretender at Fetteresso; his cause however was lost, and Mar and the Prince fled to France where he would spend the remainder of his life. The Parliament of Great Britain passed a Writ of Attainder for treason against Mar in 1716 as punishment for his disloyalty; this was not lifted until 1824. Mar was appointed to succeed Henry St John as Jacobite Secretary of State in March 1716.

Mar sought to interest foreign powers in the cause of the Stuarts; but in the course of time he became thoroughly distrusted by the Jacobites. In 1719 he was involved in plans to take advantage of Spain's ongoing war against Britain to launch a new invasion scheme, however this was dispersed by weather. In 1721 he accepted a pension of £3500 a year from George I, and in the following year his name was freely mentioned in connection with the trial of Bishop Atterbury, who, it was asserted, had been betrayed by Mar. This charge may perhaps be summarised as not proven. At the best his conduct was highly imprudent, and so in 1724 the Pretender finally broke with Mar. His later years were spent in Paris and at Aix-la-Chapelle, where he died in 1732.

Marriage, issue and descendants

Mar first married Lady Margaret Hay on 6 April 1703, daughter of Thomas Hay, 7th Earl of Kinnoull. She gave birth to a son, Thomas, in 1705. Lady Margaret died on 26 April 1707. 

Mar married his second wife Lady Frances Pierrepont, daughter of Evelyn Pierrepont, 1st Duke of Kingston-upon-Hull. The match was a success in that it finally provided Mar with the funds to begin to clear his inherited debts. Lady Frances went mad in 1728 due to the stress of his exile in France. She outlived Mar by 35 years, dying on 4 March 1767, and was buried at St Marylebone Parish Church, Westminster.

Notable relatives
Through his marriage to Lady Frances Pierrepont, Mar was a brother-in-law of Lady Mary Wortley Montagu.
Mar's brother James Erskine, Lord Grange was a noted judge.
Mar's son Thomas Erskine, Lord Erskine served as Grand Master of the Grand Lodge of Scotland (1749–1750).

In popular culture
The progressive rock band Genesis wrote a song, "Eleventh Earl of Mar" (found on their Wind & Wuthering album), about Mar and the 1715 Jacobite rising.  The lyrics were written by Mike Rutherford, who explains "I had this idea after reading this history book about a failed Scottish rising. I liked the idea of him -- he was a bit gay, a bit camp, and a bit well-dressed."

He was mentioned in a contemporary folk song "Cam Ye O'er Frae France", which was recorded by British folk rock band Steeleye Span.

He was mentioned in the Starz original series, Outlander season two, episode two.

The Alloa branch of the Wetherspoons pub chain is named "The Bobbing John" after Mar.

Notes

References
Maurice Bruce, 'The Duke of Mar in Exile, 1716-32', Transactions of the Royal Historical Society, 4th Series, Vol. 20 (1937), pp. 61-82 (JSTOR)

External links

1675 births
1732 deaths
Erskine, John
Knights of the Thistle
Scottish generals
Peers created by James Francis Edward Stuart
People of the Jacobite rising of 1715
Scottish representative peers
John
Scottish Jacobites
17th-century Scottish peers
18th-century Scottish people
Members of the Privy Council of Great Britain
Dukes of Mar
Lords Erskine